The ACM Transactions on Database Systems (ACM TODS) is one of the journals produced by the Association for Computing Machinery. TODS publishes one volume yearly. Each volume has four issues, which appear in March, June, September and December. The editor-in-chief is Christopher Jermaine (Rice University).

Abstracting and indexing
According to the Journal Citation Reports, the journal had a 2020 impact factor of 1.086.

It is indexed in the following bibliographic databases:
Ei Compendex
SCImago
Scopus
ProQuest SciTech Premium Collection
Web of Science

References

External links
 Journal homepage.

Computer science journals
Transactions on Database Systems
Hybrid open access journals